P. S. I Love You is the TV sequel of the 1981 movie itself starred by Gabby Concepcion and Sharon Cuneta. It is a Philippine drama-romance series offered by TV5 and Viva Television. 
This primetime series is led by Gabby Concepcion, Dina Bonnevie, Alex Gonzaga, Kean Cipriano, AJ Muhlach and Nadine Lustre.

It aired from November 21, 2011 to February 17, 2012, replacing Ang Utol Kong Hoodlum and was replaced by ''Nandito Ako.

The TV series is a sequel to the 1981 film that originally starred by Sharon Cuneta and Gabby Concepcion. The role of Kristine now eventually goes to Dina Bonnevie.

It is produced by Vic Del Rosario, Jr. and Manuel V. Pangilinan. It marks as the second primetime series produced by Viva Television for TV5 after a decade.

The TV series garnered positive reviews throughout the run for Philippine Entertainment Critics.

Synopsis
Mark's family business suffered from bankruptcy during the time he planned to marry Kristine. Soon after, Kristine accepted the marriage proposal of millionaire Antonio Tuazon. As they part ways, Mark became an investment banker and a self-made billionaire. On the other hand, Kristine became a devoted housewife for her family.

30 years after, Antonio Tuazon was killed and leaves his family's business in bankruptcy. Andrea Tuazon, daughter of Antonio and Kristine, steps up to save their family's assets. As advised to her, Andrea sells their business to Mark Roxas, her mother's one great love.

When Kristine finds this out, she tries everything to prevent Mark from having business transactions with her family. However, Mark's son Paul Stephen develops an intimate relationship with Kristine's youngest daughter Candice. So as the war between the ex-lovers intensifies, the love between their children blossoms.

Cast

Main cast
Gabby Concepcion as Mark Roxas - The long lost love affair of Kristine and the father of Paul Stephen.
Dina Bonnevie as Kristine Tuazon - The long lost love affair of Mark turned to be the wife of Antonio and mother of Andrea and Candice.
Alex Gonzaga as Andrea Tuazon - The eldest daughter of Antonio and Kristine. She's the one who will suffer all the triumphs of her family after the death of her father.
Kean Cipriano as Jason Jimenez - A boyband vocalist and boyfriend of Andrea.
AJ Muhlach as Paul Stephen Roxas - The bratty son of Mark Roxas.
Nadine Lustre as Candice Tuazon - The youngest daughter of Kristine and Antonio.

Supporting cast
Candy Pangilinan as Lovely 
Cheska Iñigo as Patricia
Melissa Mendez as Stella
Say Alonzo as Marga
Cogie Domingo as Donald 
Nikki Bacolod as Shirley
Jaycee Parker as Amanda
Michael Flores as Dave
Al Chris Galura as Mang Teban
Sarah Polvereni as Layla

Extended cast
DJ Durano as Atty. Fontanilla
Ara Mina as Cassandra
JC Cuadrado as Spanky
Joy Viado as Aling Taleng

Special participation
Lloyd Samartino as Antonio Tuazon
Imee Schweighart as young Kristine
Dino Imperial as young Mark

Soundtrack
The official theme song of this series is I Love You performed by Anja Aguilar. It is originally performed by Willie Revillame.

See also
List of programs aired by TV5 (Philippine TV network)

References

TV5 (Philippine TV network) drama series
2011 Philippine television series debuts
2012 Philippine television series endings
Philippine teen drama television series
Television series by Viva Television
Filipino-language television shows